Edward Rubbert (born May 28, 1965) is a former American football quarterback in the National Football League for the Washington Redskins as a member of the Redskins' replacement team during the 1987 NFL players' strike.  Rubbert played college football for the University of Louisville.  He completed the longest pass from scrimmage in the 1987 NFL season, an 88-yard touchdown to Anthony Allen on October 4, and led the Redskins to two consecutive wins on their way to a Super Bowl XXII championship. Rubbert also started a third game only to be injured; the Redskins eventually won that game behind backup replacement quarterback Tony Robinson, and the following week the Redskins' regular players returned to the field following the end of the strike.  Rubbert is now a coach for Mainland Regional High School located in Linwood, New Jersey. The high school contains kids from Linwood, Somers Point, and Northfield.

Rubbert also played for the Albany Firebirds in the Arena Football League for three years (1991 to 1993) where he completed 42 of 96 passes for 532 yards and four touchdowns and seven interceptions.

Additionally, Rubbert was the inspiration for Keanu Reeves' character in the football movie The Replacements.

References

External links
 AFL stats

1964 births
Living people
American football quarterbacks
Albany Firebirds players
Louisville Cardinals football players
Washington Redskins players
National Football League replacement players
People from Suffern, New York